The Shasu (from Egyptian šꜣsw, probably pronounced Shaswe) were Semitic-speaking cattle nomads in the Southern Levant from the late Bronze Age to the Early Iron Age or the Third Intermediate Period of Egypt. They were organized in clans under a tribal chieftain, and were described as brigands active from the Jezreel Valley to Ashkelon and the Sinai.

Some scholars link the Israelites and YHWH with the Shasu.

Etymology
The name's etymon may be Egyptian šꜣsw, which originally meant "those who move on foot". Levy, Adams, and Muniz report similar possibilities: an Egyptian word that means "to wander", and an alternative Semitic one with the meaning "to plunder".

History
The earliest known reference to the Shasu occurs in a 15th-century BCE list of peoples in the Transjordan region. The name appears in a list of Egypt's enemies inscribed on column bases at the temple of Soleb built by Amenhotep III. Copied later in the 13th century BCE either by Seti I or by Ramesses II at Amarah-West, the list mentions six groups of Shasu: the Shasu of S'rr, the Shasu of Rbn, the Shasu of Sm't, the Shasu of Wrbr, the Shasu of Yhw, and the Shasu of Pysps.

Shasu of Yhw

tA-M8-M23-w-i-i-h-V4-w

Regarding the name , Michael Astour observed that the "hieroglyphic rendering corresponds very precisely to the Hebrew tetragrammaton YHWH, or Yahweh, and antedates the hitherto oldest occurrence of that divine name – on the Moabite Stone – by over five hundred years." K. Van Der Toorn concludes: "By the 14th century BC, before the cult of Yahweh had reached Israel, groups of Edomites and Midianites worshipped Yahweh as their god."

Donald B. Redford has argued that the earliest Israelites, semi-nomadic highlanders in central Canaan mentioned on the Merneptah Stele at the end of the 13th century BCE, are to be identified as a Shasu enclave. Since later Biblical tradition portrays Yahweh "coming forth from Seʿir", the Shasu, originally from Moab and northern Edom/Seʿir, went on to form one major element in the amalgam that would constitute the "Israel" which later established the Kingdom of Israel. Per his own analysis of the el-Amarna letters, Anson Rainey concluded that the description of the Shasu best fits that of the early Israelites. If this identification is correct, these Israelites/Shasu would have settled in the uplands in small villages with buildings similar to contemporary Canaanite structures towards the end of the 13th century BCE.

Objections exist to this proposed link between the Israelites and the Shasu, given that the group in the Merneptah reliefs identified with the Israelites are not described or depicted as Shasu (see Merneptah Stele § Karnak reliefs). The Shasu are usually depicted hieroglyphically with a determinative indicating a land, not a people; the most frequent designation for the "foes of Shasu" is the hill-country determinative. Thus they are differentiated from the Canaanites, who are defending the fortified cities of Ashkelon, Gezer, and Yenoam; and from Israel, which is determined as a people, though not necessarily as a socio-ethnic group. Scholars point out that Egyptian scribes tended to bundle up "rather disparate groups of people within a single artificially unifying rubric."

Frank J. Yurco and Michael G. Hasel would distinguish the Shasu in Merneptah's Karnak reliefs from the people of Israel since they wear different clothing and hairstyles, and are determined differently by Egyptian scribes. Lawrence Stager also objected to identifying Merneptah's Shasu with Israelites, since the Shasu are shown dressed differently from the Israelites, who are dressed and hairstyled like the Canaanites.

The usefulness of the determinatives has been called into question, though, as in Egyptian writings, including the Merneptah Stele, determinatives are used arbitrarily. Gösta Werner Ahlström countered Stager's objection by arguing that the contrasting depictions are because the Shasu were the nomads, while the Israelites were sedentary, and added: "The Shasu that later settled in the hills became known as Israelites because they settled in the territory of Israel".

Moreover, the hill-country determinative is not always used for Shasu, with the Egyptologist Thomas Schneider connecting references to "Yah", believed to be an abbreviated form of the Tetragrammaton, with the writings in the Shasu-sequence at Soleb and Amarah-West.
In an Egyptian Book of the Dead papyrus from the late 18th or 19th dynasty, Schneider identifies a Northwest Semitic theophoric name ‘adōnī-rō‘ē-yāh, meaning “My lord is the shepherd of Yah”, which would be the first documented occurrence of the god Yahweh in his function as a shepherd of Yah.

See also
 Habiru
 Shutu
 Irsu
 Iah

References

Notes

Citations

Sources

 
 
 
 
 
 

 
 
 
 
 
 

 
 
 
 

 

Foreign contacts of ancient Egypt
Semitic-speaking peoples
Ancient peoples of the Near East
Ancient Levant
Nomadic groups in Eurasia
Third Intermediate Period of Egypt